Roger Craig may refer to:

Roger Craig (American football) (born 1960), former American football running back
Roger Craig (baseball) (born 1930), former pitcher, coach and manager in Major League Baseball
Roger Craig (Jeopardy! contestant) (born 1977), former Jeopardy! contestant
Roger D. Craig (1936–1975), deputy sheriff of Dallas, Texas
Roger Scott Craig, Irish musician

See also
Roger Craig Smith (born 1975), American voice actor